Anguilla women's national football team is the national team of Anguilla,  a British Overseas Territory in the Caribbean, and is controlled by the Anguilla Football Association. It is affiliated to the Caribbean Football Union of CONCACAF. As of November 2015, it remains unranked on the FIFA Women's World Rankings.

History
In 2003, Anguilla did play four matches but these were not FIFA recognised.  The team played six matches in 2004, two of which were FIFA recognised.  The country's first FIFA recognised matched was played on Saturday, 28 August 2004 in a game played in St. John's against Antigua and Barbuda women's national football team, with Antigua and Barbuda winning 1–0.  They played their second FIFA recognised match one day later in the same city with Anguilla pulling off a 1–0 victory.  In 2005, the national team played in 10 matches, none of which were FIFA recognised.  In 2006, the team played 0 games at a time when the team had four training sessions a week. The following year, they again failed to play a single FIFA recognised match. In 2008, they participated in two FIFA recognised matches, with both games being played in August in St. Croix, US Virgin Islands.  In the first match on 29 August, they tied the US Virgin Islands 2–2 after being behind 0–1 at the half.  They won the second match against the US Virgin Islands 1–0 on 31 August. The team did not play a FIFA recognised match in 2009.

2010 CONCACAF Gold Cup
Anguilla entered in the Caribbean qualifiers for the 2010 Gold Cup, held in Mexico during 28 October–8 November 2010. The team was drawn along with Barbados and Grenada. The first game (as away team) was in Barbados National Stadium and finished with an 0–3 loss to Barbados. Again in Barbados National Stadium, Anguilla faced Grenada, and the result was a 2–0 victory. Despite this result, Anguilla didn't qualify to the next stage because the only place from Group E was occupied by Barbados, who won both of its matches. With this result, Anguilla was also eliminated from the 2011 World Cup, celebrated in Germany.

2014 CONCACAF Gold Cup
Anguilla's selected rivals for the qualifiers of the 2014 Caribbean Cup (qualifying tournament for the 2014 Gold Cup) were Jamaica, Dominican Republic and Saint Lucia in the Group 5. Anguilla withdrew before the start of the competition due to the outbreak of Chikungunya virus. This means that Anguilla's last match to the date was on 30 March 2010 against Grenada for the 2010 qualifiers.

Team image

Home stadium
The Anguilla women's national football team plays their home matches on the Ronald Webster Park.

Results and fixtures

The following is a list of match results in the last 12 months, as well as any future matches that have been scheduled.
Legend

2022

Players

Current squad
The following players were called up for the match against Mexico on 9 April 2022.

Recent call ups

Head-to-head record

Coaching staff

Manager history
 Colin Johnson (2004–2019)
 Keturah Caines (2019–2021)
 Ahkeela Mollon (2021–)

Competitive record

FIFA Women's World Cup

CONCACAF W Championship

CFU Women's Caribbean Cup/Challenge Series

*Draws include knockout matches decided on penalty kicks.

See also

Sport in Anguilla
Football in Anguilla
Women's football in Anguilla
Anguilla women's national under-20 football team
Anguilla women's national under-17 football team
Anguilla men's national football team

References

External links
FIFA profile

Caribbean women's national association football teams
women